Radish mosaic virus (RaMV) is a plant pathogenic virus of the family Comoviridae.

External links
ICTVdB - The Universal Virus Database: Radish mosaic virus
Family Groups - The Baltimore Method

Comoviruses
Viral plant pathogens and diseases